Ancient kings of Finland are kings of Finland mentioned in early historical sources. The word kuningas (Finnish for "king") is an old Finnic word deriving from the ancient Germanic word kuningaz. In the time the sources were written, "Finland" mainly referred to the Finland Proper area, and depending on the source, the "kings of Finland" could also refer to kings of the Sami people.

Literal sources
Most of the literal material concerning ancient kings of Finland comes from Norway, Iceland and Denmark. The earliest source about a king of Finland, however, is the Widsith poem written in Old English in the 6th or 7th century. The poem says "Casere weold Creacum ond Cælic Finnum" ("Casere rules over the Greek and Cælic over the Finns"). Cælic has been seen to refer to Kaleva, but nothing can be said about this for certain.

The geographer al-Idrisi born in the realm of the Almoravid dynasty mentions in his 1154 book Tabula Rogeriana lands called Fymark and Tabast, which could possibly refer to Finland Proper and Tavastia. According to al-Idrisi, the king of Fymark owned lands around the Arctic Sea. According to Jalmari Jaakkola, this would mean wilderness lands in the north owned by people coming from Upper Satakunta (Pirkanmaa). However, al-Idrisi's description of Northern Europe is confusing and contains obvious misunderstandings.

The Egil's Saga from approximately the 13th century mentions the people of Kvenland led by their king Faravid waging war against the Karelians. According to the saga Faravid, commanding an army of 300 men, allied with the Norwegian chief Thorolf. The allies waged war on Karelia and made a great victory. Faravid is an Old Norse name, but as no such name is known among the Scandinavians, it has been interpreted as a translation of a Finnish name similar to "Kaukomieli" (literally "far-mind") or "Kaukamoinen". In the saga description, Faravid is placed in a context in the 9th century, but according to Kyösti Julku and Mikko Häme this point of time would be too early considering the attack of the Karelians mentioned in the saga. According to them, a more probable alternative for the century of Faravid's lifetime would be the 12th century.

Among the best known mythical ancient Finnish kings is Fornjótr, who is mentioned in the Orkneyinga saga written in the 13th century. Fornjótr is described as a king who ruled over "Finnland and Kvenland". Fornjótr's son Nórr is described as the founder of Norway and king Harald Fairhair as his distant descendant.

The historian Saxo Grammaticus repeatedly describes Finland and the Finns in his book Gesta Danorum about Danish history. Of the Finnish kings he mentions Sumblum and Gusonis, who is also the king of Bjarmaland. In these writings, the Finnish kings are mentioned when their daughters are courted. The historical reliability of Saxo's writings, among that of other early historical sources, is questionable.

Some other sources also mention the concept of a "king of Finland". For example the Edda poem The song of Völundr the mythical smith Völundr is mentioned as both the son of a Finnish king and a king of elves. Saxo Grammaticus's Gesta Danorum mentions that the Danish king Ragnar had waged war against the king of Finland.

In 1340 25 peasants from Sääksmäki were excommunicated for failing to pay taxes. A list of these peasants remains, which mentions a person called Cuningas de Rapalum, meaning "King of Rapola". The name refers to an ancient Tavastian chief tradition. "Kuningas" (Finnish for "king") is known in many medieval contexts as a personal or vocative name, and it is very probably such a name in this context too and not a title. The name has most probably referred to a local chief, the master of a mansion. According to Georg Haggrén, the "King of Rapola" was, like the other excommunicated peasants from Sääksmäki, a member of a council, one of the most prestigious trusted men in the village.

In 1438 the peasant David from Satakunta declared himself as "the king of the peasants" during the David rebellion. Also other middle European rebel leaders  in late medieval times declared themselves as kings without requiring a monarchical kingship as such. In compound words such as "nuottakuningas" or "huuhtakuningas", which were still in use in the 19th and 20th centuries, the term "kuningas" has referred to labour leaders selected from peasant labour forces. Kristfried Ganander mentions a Finnish king named Tuisko in his book Mythologia Fennica from 1789.

Archaeological sources
There is so far no archaeological or historical evidence about any ancient settlements in Finland larger or more tightly organised than villages. According to archaeological sources, there was no strong political organisation comparable to monarchies in the Finland area during the Iron Age, but some chiefs might have briefly held power over large areas. It is probable that during the Iron Age, the people living in what is now Finland called their elected chiefs, men with inherited power, or other prestigious persons with the term "kuningas". According to Jouko Vahtola, if there have been men of power called with the term "kuningas" in the area which is now Finland, they were most probably family leaders of local communities, chiefs of tax or military raids or leaders of common enterprises.

During the Viking Age, of the areas around Finland, Denmark, Norway and Sweden (particularly the Mälaren area) started to form into monarchies, where power was consolidated into the hands of one nobleman. According to archelogical sources, there was also political organisation in Finland, particularly from the Vendel Period to the Crusade Period, but it is difficult to archelogically estimate the exact nature of the organisation. According to jewellery worn by women, cultural regions during the Crusade Period or Finnish tribes can be divided into the cultural regions of the Finns proper, the Tavastians and the Savonians and the Karelians. The spread of different kinds of buckles has been seen to refer to expressing "Finnish", "Tavastian" and "Karelian" identities. Most probably the area around Finland resembled Iron-Age Gotland, Iceland or Jämtland in Northern Sweden, where power was held by local leaders competing with each other. These communities had a common court and decisive system. In Southern Finland these could have been represented with local courts.

The spread of valuable findings of weapons and jewellery into Southwestern Finland and Southern Ostrobothnia and valuable burials and cremations in these regions has been interpreted as the formation of an upper class since the Lower Roman Iron Age (0 - 400 CE). The Soukainen mass grave in Laitila from the 3rd century has been mentioned as an early example of a grave of a local "prince" or "king". A greater number of these graves is known from the Vendel Period, such as the graves in Pappilanmäki in Eura, in Pukkila in Isokyrö and in Kaavontonkä in Vähäkyrö. A tool found from a grave in Käräjänmäki in Eura from the late 6th century has been interpreted as referring to the high rank of the buried person. A similar tool found from the Sutton Hoo ship burial has been interpreted as a regal sceptre. Finland underwent a development that could have formed a contiguous monarchy given enough time. The development slowed down when the western parts of Finland were joined as part of the influence region of Svealand and Götaland from the 13th century. According to the Norwegian archeologist Björn Myhre, there were chiefdoms and "minor monarchies" in Iron-Age Finland.

There have also been theories of the existence of local defence organisations in Finland based on hillforts, particularly in Tavastia and Satakunta. These theories have been criticised by Jussi-Pekka Taavitsainen. Most modern historians believe the theory concerning the hillfort chain in Tavastia to be sound. Modern research mostly sees ancient hillforts as evidence of unorganised communities whose warfare was based on short raids and defence from such. The hillforts were not suitable for long sieges.

List of ancient kings of Finland

Sources
Gallén, Jarl: Länsieurooppalaiset ja skandinaaviset Suomen esihistoriaa koskevat lähteet. In: Suomen väestön esihistorialliset juuret, pp. 249–263. Title: Tvärminnen symposiumi 17.–19.1.1980. Bidrag till kännedom av Finlands natur och folk h. 131. Helsinki: Societas Scientiarum Fennica, 1984. .
Hiekkanen, Markus: Suomen keskiajan kivikirkot, p. 14. Suomalaisen Kirjallisuuden Seuran toimituksia 1117. Helsinki: Suomalaisen Kirjallisuuden Seura, 2007. .
Häme, Mikko: Saagoista ja muinaisista kuninkaistamme. Faravid 15. Pohjois-Suomen historiallisen yhdistyksen vuosikirja. Oulu 1991
Lahtonen, Irmeli: A Land Beyond Seas and Mountains: A Study of References to Finland in Anglo-Saxon Sources. Suomen varhaishistoria. Tornion kongressi 14.–16.6.1991. (edited by Kyösti Julku). Studia historica septentrionalia 21. Rovaniemi; Pohjois-Suomen Historiallinen Yhdistys 1992: pp. 641–651.
Messenius, Johannes: Suomen, Liivinmaan ja Kuurinmaan vaiheita and Suomen kronikka by unknown. Edited and explained by Martti Linna. Suomalaisen Kirjallisuuden Seuran Toimituksia. Helsinki 1988.
Raninen, Sami & Wessman, Anna: Rautakausi. In: Haggrén, Georg; Halinen, Petri; Lavento, Mika; Raninen, Sami & Wessman, Anna (ed.): Muinaisuutemme jäljet. Suomen esi- ja varhaishistoria kivikaudelta keskiajalle., pp. 213–365. Helsinki: Gaudeamus, 2015. .

References

External links
Olivatko viikinkikuninkaat suomalaisia? Kaltio.
Klaus Lindgren, "Uusi uljas menneisyys" (Agricolan tietosanomat 4-2018)
Sirpa Aalto, "Finnit, kveenit ja bjarmit islantilaisissa kuningassaagoissa". Saagojen tulkitsemisen hankaluuksista (pdf) (Archive.org)
Aalto, Sirpa; Hihnala, Harri: "Saagat tuntevat Suomen kuninkaat" – pseudohistoriallisesta kirjoittelusta Suomen muinaisuudesta. Jargonia, 2017, 15. vsk, nro 29. Jyväskylä: Jyväskylän yliopiston Historian ja etnologian laitoksen tutkijat ry. ISSN 1459-305X. Online version (PDF).
Koskinen, Inkeri: Villi Suomen historia: Välimeren Väinämöisestä Äijäkupittaan pyramideihin. Helsinki: Tammi, 2015. .

Finnish legendary creatures
History of Finland
Rulers of Finland
Pseudohistory
Fictional royalty